Enchantment is a 1948 romantic drama film starring David Niven and Teresa Wright, directed by Irving Reis, produced by Samuel Goldwyn, and based on the 1945 novel A Fugue in Time by Rumer Godden.

Plot
In World War II London, a bold American servicewoman named Grizel Dane (Evelyn Keyes) pays a visit to her granduncle, aged General Sir Roland 'Rollo' Dane (David Niven), looking for a place to stay. At first reluctant to disturb his routine, Rollo soon gives in.

Interspersed flashbacks reveal the history of the Dane family. The first takes place when Rollo (Peter Miles) is a child. He and his older siblings, Selina (Sherlee Collier) and Pelham (Warwick Gregson), are introduced to Lark Ingoldsby (Gigi Perreau) by their father (Colin Keith-Johnston). He explains that her parents have been killed in the Tay Bridge disaster and that she will be living with them as a member of the family. Selina immediately resents the newcomer.

The second flashback occurs when the children have grown up. Roland's father has died, leaving Selina (played as an adult by Jayne Meadows) in charge of Lark (Teresa Wright), whom she treats more like a servant than a member of the family. Rollo (David Niven) returns on leave from the army. When Lark asks Pelham (Philip Friend) for a dress, the first that would not be a hand-me-down from Selina, he realizes that she is growing up and invites her to a dance. She becomes acquainted with the Marchese Guido Del Laudi (Shepperd Strudwick), a business associate of Pelham's.

In the last flashback, Lark is being courted by the Marchese. Pelham unexpectedly reveals his love for her with a kiss, but her reaction makes it clear that she does not love him. Rollo surprises everyone by returning early from his latest posting on Lark's birthday. Rollo and Lark finally acknowledge their love for each other, but Selina has other plans. She has arranged for General Fitzgerald (Henry Stephenson) to appoint Rollo to his staff for a five-year mission to Afghanistan. However, Lark refuses to wait that long, living uneasily with both Selina and Pelham. When Rollo is indecisive, she goes up to her room. Rollo makes his choice; he hastens to refuse the appointment, but Selina confronts Lark, telling her that Rollo has decided to take the job. When he does not return by the next morning, Lark is convinced and leaves to marry the Marchese. Rollo returns too late, finding only a letter Lark wrote in which she says, "Selina was right."  Furious at his sister's malicious meddling, Rollo vows never to enter the house again while she lives.

In the story set in World War II, ambulance driver Grizel transports injured Pilot Officer Pax Masterson (Farley Granger) to a hospital. Later, she is surprised to find him in the general's house. It turns out he is Lark's nephew. While he waits for the old man to return home, Pax and Grizel become acquainted. As time goes on, they start falling in love. When Pax receives his orders, he asks her to marry him, but she is daunted by the uncertainties of war. As Pax is leaving, Rollo hands him a telegram addressed to him; it announces that Lark died the month before. Rollo talks to Grizel and persuades her not to throw away the chance for love as he did. She runs after Pax in the middle of a bombing raid and embraces him. While she is away, a bomb demolishes the house and kills Rollo.

Cast

 David Niven as General Sir Roland 'Rollo' Dane
 Teresa Wright as Lark Ingoldsby
 Evelyn Keyes as Grizel Dane
 Farley Granger as Pilot Officer Pax Masterson
 Jayne Meadows as Selina Dane
 Leo G. Carroll as Proutie, the Dane family butler
 Philip Friend as Pelham Dane
 Shepperd Strudwick as the Marchese Guido Del Laudi
 Henry Stephenson as General Fitzgerald
 Colin Keith-Johnston as Mr. Dane, the father of the Dane children
 Gigi Perreau as Lark as a child
 Peter Miles as Rollo as a child. Peter is Gigi Perreau's older brother.
 Sherlee Collier as Selina as a child
 Warwick Gregson as Pelham as a child
 Marjorie Rhodes as Mrs Sampson
 Edmund Breon as Uncle Bunny
 Gerald Oliver Smith as Willoughby
 Melville Cooper as Jones, the jeweller
 Matthew Boulton as Air Raid Warden
 William Johnstone as Narrator (voice)

Reception
The Brooklyn Eagle found the film "beautifully packaged...a Christmas gift for all those who prefer their love stories told between sighs and suppressed tears, told with an artful catch in the throat." The acting and direction were praised overall – "the entire film is marked by excellent taste" – while still finding the film "a little bit too well-bred, a little too correct, on the bloodless side, you might say."
Columnist Hedda Hopper reported that "the film lives up to its title. It has charm, romance, and pathos....Samuel Goldwyn has done it again."
It was the highest-grossing film in Italy in 1957.

References

External links
 
 
 
 
 

1940s American films
1940s English-language films
1948 films
1948 romantic drama films
American romantic drama films
American black-and-white films
American World War II films
Films about orphans
Films based on British novels
Films based on romance novels
Films based on works by Rumer Godden
Films directed by Irving Reis
Films scored by Hugo Friedhofer
Films set in London
Films set in the 19th century
Films set in the 1940s
RKO Pictures films
Samuel Goldwyn Productions films